Luo Yi (Chinese: 罗毅; born 24 June 1987 in Wuhan) is a Chinese professional football player who currently plays as a winger or full-back for Chinese Super League side Wuhan Zall.

Club career
In 2008, Luo Yi started his professional footballer career with Wuhan Huanghelou in the Chinese Super League after he was promoted from their youth team. On 27 February 2009, Luo transferred to another Chinese Super League side in Chongqing Lifan. He would make his league debut for Chongqing on 22 March 2009 in a game against Beijing Guoan, coming on as a substitute for Hu Wei in the 75th minute in a game that ended in a 3-1 defeat. After the game Luo would gradually establish himself as regular within the squad, however he was part of the team that was relegated at the end of the 2010 Chinese Super League season. 

On 3 January 2012, Luo returned to his hometown to join China League One side Wuhan Zall on a free transfer. He would make his debut for the club on 17 March 2012 in a league game against Harbin Yiteng that ended in a 0-0 draw. Throughout the season Luo would be an integral member of the squad that came runners-up within the division and gain promotion to the top tier. After only one season within the top flight the club were relegated at the end of the 2013 Chinese Super League season. Luo would remain an integral member of the squad until the club eventually won promotion again by winning the 2018 China League One division.

Career statistics 
Statistics accurate as of match played 31 December 2020.

Honours

Club
Wuhan Zall
 China League One: 2018

References

External links
 

1987 births
Living people
Chinese footballers
Footballers from Wuhan
Wuhan Guanggu players
Chongqing Liangjiang Athletic F.C. players
Wuhan F.C. players
Chinese Super League players
China League One players
Association football defenders 
Association football midfielders
21st-century Chinese people